The Biinjitiwaabik Zaaging Anishinaabek (formerly known as Rocky Bay First Nation) is an Ojibway First Nation band government in Northwestern Ontario, Canada.  Their territory is located on the Rocky Bay 1 reserve in Greenstone, Ontario, bordering on the community of Macdiarmid.  In October 2008, they had a total registered population of 678 people, of which 327 people lived on their own Indian reserve. The Nation is led by Chief Gladys Thompson. The council is a member of Nokiiwin Tribal Council, a Regional Chiefs' Council, and is member of Union of Ontario Indians, a Tribal Political Organization. The First Nation is also a member of Waaskiinaysay Ziibi Inc., an economic development corporation made up of five Lake Nipigon First Nations.

History
The first nation's television series Spirit Bay was filmed here in the 1980s. A modern school in Rocky Bay has been named the "Spirit Bay School" after the series.

In June 1994, the Chiefs at the Anishinabek Grand Council on the Rocky Bay First Nation, directed that the Education Directorate formally establish the Anishinabek Education Institute (AEI) in accordance with the post secondary education model that was submitted and ratified. (Res. 94/13)

References

External links
Biinjitiwaabik Zaaging Anishinaabek First Nation
AANDC profile
FirstNations.ca profile

First Nations governments in Ontario
Ojibwe governments